The Gun Club were an American rock band from Los Angeles, California, United States, which existed from 1979 to 1996. It was formed and led by singer-songwriter and guitarist Jeffrey Lee Pierce.

History

Early days (1979–1980)
The Gun Club were formed by Jeffrey Lee Pierce (guitar and vocals) with friend, chief of the Ramones fan club and fellow music enthusiast Brian Tristan, also known as Kid Congo Powers. Pierce was the former head of the Blondie fan club in Los Angeles and previously a member of the Red Lights, the E-Types, the Individuals, Phast Phreddie & Thee Precisions, and the Cyclones.

The Gun Club's precursor band, The Creeping Ritual, formed in late 1979. Along with Pierce (lead vocals and guitar), the first lineup consisted of Brian Tristan (lead guitar); Don Snowden (bass), who was at the time a music critic for the Los Angeles Times; and Brad Dunning (drums), now a prominent designer and writer. In April 1980, they changed their name to “The Gun Club” on a suggestion by Pierce's roommate, Circle Jerks singer Keith Morris. Kid Congo commented that the early Gun Club incarnation were "too arty for rock people, far too rock for arty people, too cuckoo for the blues crowd and too American for punk". Snowden and Dunning departed in June 1980, replaced by two ex-members of the Bags, Rob Ritter and Terry Graham, respectively. Ritter was temporarily replaced on bass by Anna Statman for two months in the fall of 1980. Kid Congo Powers then left, on amicable terms, to join The Cramps in November 1980 and was replaced by lead and slide guitarist Ward Dotson (ex-Der Stab) who had initially hoped to join The Cramps. During this period, the Gun Club often opened for X, the Bags, Circle Jerks and the Blasters.

Fire of Love and Miami (1981–1982)
Securing a record deal with Ruby Records, a division of Slash, the group released their debut album, Fire of Love, on August 31, 1981. The album was produced by Tito Larriva (of the Plugz) and Chris D. (frontman of the Flesh Eaters). Critic Stevo Olende wrote that the "album's lyrical imagery is plundered from voodoo, '50s EC Comics and the blues", while Thom Jurek of AllMusic noted that "nobody has heard music like this before or since". Fire of Love sold well and received strong reviews upon release. Billy Persons of the Weirdos temporarily replaced Ritter for several shows in late 1981.

In April 1982, the Gun Club signed to Blondie guitarist Chris Stein's Animal Records, a subsidiary of Chrysalis Records. The band temporarily relocated to New York City to record their follow-up album, 1982's Miami. This album featured not only Stein as producer, but Blondie's Debbie Harry singing backup vocals on several tracks. Ritter left in June 1982 to concentrate on his other band, 45 Grave, and changed his name to Rob Graves. Before leaving, Ritter taught the bass parts to his former Bags bandmate Patricia Morrison (also ex-Legal Weapon) and trained her as his replacement. For their West Coast shows in August 1982, Annie Ungar was added as a second guitarist. Upon the release of Miami on September 20, 1982, the album received good reviews but has been criticised for Stein's thin production. Due to increasingly frequent arguments, Pierce dismissed Graham and Dotson in December 1982.

The Las Vegas Story and first break-up (1983–1985)
In January 1983, Graham and Dotson were replaced by guitarist Jim Duckworth (formerly of Tav Falco's Panther Burns) and drummer Dee Pop (formerly of the New York band Bush Tetras). A spare recording session, originally booked for another band, led to the impromptu recording of the Death Party EP with bassist Jimmy Joe Uliana quickly filling in for Morrison and Linda 'Texacala' Jones on backing vocals. Released April 13, 1983 by Animal, it was the only recording of the short-lived lineup featuring Duckworth and Pop. During this time Pierce refrained from playing guitar, focusing solely on singing. After eight months Graham returned, replacing Pop, and on the eve of the October 1983 Australian tour, both Duckworth and Graham quit, refusing to board the plane. Arriving minus half the band, Pierce recruited drummer Billy Pommer Jr. and guitarist Spencer P. Jones from support act the Johnnys to fill in on the tour, while former member Powers also flew over to play guitar. When they returned to the US in November, Graham resumed his place on drums.

Pierce returned to guitar playing during this lineup, and both he and Powers are credited with guitar on their third album, The Las Vegas Story (the Blasters' Dave Alvin also played lead guitar on a handful of tracks). Released on June 25, 1984, this album marked a significant change for the band; it represented a shift away from the punk rock of Fire of Love and Miami and a step towards a more polished alternative rock sound. After US gigs supporting Siouxsie and the Banshees, in September the band embarked on a European tour in support of the album, but after five weeks Graham again departed after a gig in Paris. The band carried on and he was replaced with former roadie Peter Kablean, known as Desi Desperate, despite having no rehearsal. The Gun Club broke up in January 1985, Pierce remaining in London with then-girlfriend Romi Mori, who he had met during the final December 10–11 shows at Dingwalls, London.

After the break-up, Powers, Morrison and Desperate formed a band called Fur Bible (Morrison later joined the Sisters of Mercy and the Damned), while Pierce embarked on a solo career. Pierce assembled a band, the Jeffrey Lee Pierce Quartet, consisting of former members of the Cure and Roxy Music, and released Wildweed in 1985. He organized a new band to tour in support of the album, including Mori on guitar and Nick Sanderson of Clock DVA on drums.

Reformation (1986–1994)
After a short stint doing spoken word performances, Pierce decided to reform a new version of the band in October 1986. Powers, who had also been recruited into Nick Cave and the Bad Seeds at this time, resumed his place at guitar, with Mori switching to bass and Sanderson retaining his spot on drums. This lineup of the Gun Club recorded a handful of albums, including Mother Juno, released October 19, 1987 on Red Rhino Records. This album, produced by Robin Guthrie of the Cocteau Twins, was a successful comeback, garnering a positive critical reception. After the release of Nick Cave's album The Good Son, Powers departed the Bad Seeds in May 1990 to focus more on the Gun Club.

The band's fifth studio effort, Pastoral Hide and Seek, which Pierce produced himself, was released October 1, 1990 on the Fire label. Sanderson departed in December 1990 to focus on his other project, World of Twist. Desperate rejoined to record the Divinity album, released in August 1991 on New Rose Records, but the band were inactive during the remainder of that year as Pierce was hospitalized during his travels in India and Vietnam. Pierce also recorded with Cypress Grove.

Simon Fish, who had previously played with Pierce on one of his solo albums, joined the band in March 1992. At the conclusion of a European tour in May 1992, Powers left the band to focus on his other project, Congo Norvell. In February 1993, the band reconvened as a trio of Pierce, Mori and the returning Sanderson, to record the Lucky Jim album. For their spring 1993 European tour, they were joined by guitarist Rainer Lingk of Die Haut. Lucky Jim was released September 20, 1993 by Triple X Records, and Robert Marche (formerly of Subway Sect and JoBoxers) joined on guitar in October.

In May 1994, Mori and Pierce split up, and she and Sanderson left the Gun Club (Mori and Sanderson formed Freeheat in 1999 with Jim Reid and Ben Lurie of the Jesus and Mary Chain). Sanderson and Marche formed Earl Brutus. In the fall of 1994, Pierce put together a new lineup featuring Marche, bassist Efe and the returning Fish, lasting until November.

Final days (1995–1996)
An increasingly ill Pierce put together a penultimate Gun Club lineup for two shows in Los Angeles in August and September 1995, including guitarists Powers and Mike Martt (ex-Tex & the Horseheads), and the Wayne Kramer rhythm section of bassist Randy Bradbury and drummer Brock Avery. The final lineup of the Gun Club, with bassist Elizabeth Montague replacing Bradbury (who was touring with Pennywise), played only one show, the band's last, at The Palace in Hollywood on December 18, 1995.
 	
On March 25, 1996, Pierce was found unconscious at his father's home in Salt Lake City, Utah. He was hospitalized and remained in a coma until his death from a brain hemorrhage on March 31, effectively ending the Gun Club.

Musical style and influences
The Gun Club's musical style was influenced by punk rock, blues, rockabilly and swamp rock. Their music encompassed post-punk, punk blues, cowpunk, blues rock and gothic country. They were also called a "tribal psychobilly blues" band. According to a 2014 profile on the band, Jeffrey Lee Pierce "took Robert Johnson and pre-war acoustic blues and 'punkified' it. Up until then bands were drawing on Iggy & The Stooges and the New York Dolls but he took it back so much further for inspiration."

Legacy
The White Stripes played "For the Love of Ivy" and "Jack on Fire" (both from Fire of Love) at live shows. That band's vocalist and guitarist, Jack White, said, "'Sex Beat', 'She's Like Heroin to Me', and 'For the Love of Ivy'...why are these songs not taught in schools?"

Swedish punk and rock icon Joakim Thåström is a very big fan of the Gun Club and has referenced them and Pierce in several songs like "Ingen sjunger blues som Jeffrey Lee Pierce", "Samarkanda" and "Beväpna dig med vingar".

Singer Mark Lanegan included Miami among his favorite recordings, and covered Pierce's "Carry Home" on his 1999 album of cover songs, I'll Take Care of You.

Canadian rock band Japandroids included "For the Love of Ivy" on their sophomore album Celebration Rock.  Brian King (vocalist/guitarist) said "the magnitude of discovering The Gun Club cannot be understated."

Discography

Studio albums
 Fire of Love (1981, Ruby Records/Slash Records)
 Miami (1982, Animal Records)
 The Las Vegas Story (1984, Animal Records/Chrysalis Records)
 Mother Juno (1987, Red Rhino Records)
 Pastoral Hide and Seek (1990, Fire Records (UK), The Orchard Music (on behalf of Blixa Sounds); BMI - Broadcast Music Inc.)
 Divinity (1991, New Rose Records)
 Lucky Jim (1993, Triple X Records)

Singles and EPs
 "Ghost on the Highway"/"Sex Beat" 7" single (1982, Beggars Banquet Records)   
 "Fire of Love" 7" single (1982, Animal Records)
 Death Party 12" EP (1983, Animal Records)
 Sex Beat 81 7" single (1986, Lolita)
 "Breaking Hands" 7"/12" single (1988, Red Rhino Records)
 "Sex Beat" CD single (1989, New Rose Records)
 "The Great Divide" 7"/12" single (1990, New Rose Records)
 "Pastoral, Hide & Seek (The Lost Song)" 7"/CD single (1991, New Rose Records)
 "Cry to Me" 7" single (1993, Sympathy for the Record Industry)
 "Walkin' With the Beast" 7" single (2004, Sympathy for the Record Industry)

Live albums
 The Birth the Death the Ghost (1983, ABC Records; recorded 1980)
 Sex Beat 81 (1984, Lolita; recorded 1981)
 Love Supreme (1985, Offense Records; recorded 1982)  
 Danse Kalinda Boom – Live in Pandora's Box  (1985, Megadisc; recorded 1984)
 Death Party (1987, Revenge Records; recorded 1981–1982)
 Ahmed's Wild Dream (1992, Solid Records; recorded 1992)
 Live in Europe (1993, Triple X Records; recorded 1992)
 Larger Than Live! (2008, Last Call Records; recorded 1990)
 Destroy the Country (2014, Cleopatra Records; recorded 1983) 
 Moonlight Motel  (2014, Cleopatra Records; recorded 1983–1984)

Compilation albums
 Two Sides of the Beast (1985, Dojo Records)
 In Exile (1992, Triple X Records)
 Early Warning (1997, Sympathy for the Record Industry)
 Pastoral Hide & Seek/Divinity (1997, 2.13.61 Records)
 Da Blood Done Signed My Name (2007, Castle Communications) 
 The Life and Times of Jeffrey Lee Pierce and the Gun Club box set (2008, Retro Deluxe)  
 Mother Berlin (2014, Bang! Records)
 In My Room (2017, Bang! Records)

Compilation appearances
 "Devil in the Woods" on Keats Rides a Harley (1981, Happy Squid Records)
 "Devil in the Woods" and "Preaching Blues" on Keats Rides a Harley (2005, Warning Label)
 "Jack on Fire" on Rockabilly Psychosis and the Garage Disease (1984, Big Beat Records)
 "Sex Beat" on Slash: The Early Sessions  (1984, Slash Records)

Live videos
 Live at the Hacienda VHS (1994, Visionary Communications/Jettisoundz; recorded 1983)
 Preaching the Blues VHS (1995, Visionary Communications/Jettisoundz; recorded 1984)
 Live at the Hacienda 1983/84  DVD (2006, Cherry Red Films; recorded 1983–1984)
 Fire of Love DVD (2007, Cherry Red Films; recorded 1983/1985)

References

External links
The Gun Club archives
Discography – no recent updates, but still very detailed.
 
 

1979 establishments in California
1996 disestablishments in California
Musical groups from Los Angeles
Sympathy for the Record Industry artists
Musical groups established in 1979
Musical groups disestablished in 1996
Post-punk music groups
Punk blues musical groups
Beggars Banquet Records artists
Chrysalis Records artists
I.R.S. Records artists
Cooking Vinyl artists
Slash Records artists
Fire Records (UK) artists
Triple X Records artists